Dan Cray (born 20 September 1977) is an American jazz pianist most associated with Chicago.

Discography 
 2002: Who Cares (Gats Production)
 2016: Outside In (Origin Records)

References

External links 
 

American jazz pianists
American male pianists
1976 births
Living people
Musicians from Chicago
Jazz musicians from Illinois
21st-century American pianists
21st-century American male musicians
American male jazz musicians
Origin Records artists